Nancy Gustafson  (born June 27, 1956, in Evanston, Illinois) is an American opera singer.

She received her B.A. from Mount Holyoke College in 1978 and her M.Mus. from Northwestern University.  She has appeared in numerous productions at venues both in the United States (including the Lyric Opera of Chicago and the Metropolitan Opera) and in Europe (including Milan's La Scala, London's Covent Garden, and the Paris Opera). She has performed with Plácido Domingo, José Carreras, Luciano Pavarotti, Andrea Bocelli and Joan Sutherland in numerous productions.

In Vienna, Austria, she was honored with the title Kammersängerin by the Vienna State Opera. In 2005 in London, she appeared in the world premiere of the opera 1984, based upon the famous novel by George Orwell. In 2006, she was appointed artist-in-residence at Northwestern University's Bienen School of Music.

References

External links
 Mount Holyoke College Biography
 Northwestern University Faculty Profile
 

American operatic sopranos
Mount Holyoke College alumni
Evanston Township High School alumni
1956 births
Living people
Northwestern University faculty
Bienen School of Music alumni
20th-century American women  opera singers
21st-century American women opera singers
Österreichischer Kammersänger
American women academics
Cedille Records artists